At approximately 15:00 UTC on Monday 2 January 2006, in the town of Bad Reichenhall, Bavaria, Germany, near the Austrian border, the roof of a 1970s-built ice rink collapsed, possibly under the weight of a heavy snow load, trapping 50 people underneath the rubble.

Fifteen people were killed, with the last body being recovered early on 5 January. Eight children are known to have died. Thirty-two people were injured. Weather conditions in the area were extremely severe, an avalanche having killed three people nearby earlier in the day.

The rescue was temporarily halted on 3 January due to fears that the walls of the ice rink could collapse, endangering firefighters, police and rescue workers. However it resumed in the early hours of the next morning.

The accident provoked outrage in the town as it emerged that officials had halted the training session of an ice hockey team inside the rink due to fears that the wall could collapse. Prior to the disaster, officials had planned to close the ice rink on Monday 2 January as snowfall was continuing. However, as many meteorologists pointed out, the weather and snow conditions were not unusual for the time of the year as the town lies in a popular winter sport area of Southern Germany.

Local officials examined the collapsed roof on Monday and suggested that the accumulated snow was below the limit for the roof.

See also 

 Katowice Trade Hall roof collapse – a similar accident on 28 January 2006, in Katowice, Poland.
 List of structural failures and collapses
 Structural integrity and failure
 Structural robustness

External links

 USA Today story on the collapse
 German ice rink toll climbs to 14, cnn.com
 Pressing questions over rink tragedy
 'Final body' found at German rink, BBC News
 

Building collapses in 2006
2006 in Germany
2006 industrial disasters
2000s in Bavaria
Building collapses in Germany
January 2006 events in Europe
Berchtesgadener Land
2006 disasters in Germany